Ruža vetrova Beograda (trans. Belgrade Wind Rose) is a compilation album from Serbian rock Bajaga i Instruktori, released in 2003.

The album, after the idea of journalist Peca Popović, features the band's songs inspired by the city of Belgrade. The compilation features two previously unreleased songs, "Novosti" ("The News") and "Ruža vetrova", as well as a remix of the latter.

Track listing
"Ruža vetrova" - 4:42
"Ovo je Balkan" - 3:03
"Grudi nosi k'o odlikovanja" - 3:25
"Zmaj od Noćaja" - 5:44
"Pustite me druže" - 2:40
"Papaline" - 2:01
"Red i mir" - 2:57
"442 do Beograda" - 4:41
"Zvezda" - 4:15
"Ruski voz" - 4:16
"Što ne može niko možeš ti" - 5:10
"Grad" - 3:51
"Dobro jutro, džezeri" - 3:06
"Novosti" - 3:51
"Ruža vetrova (Urban Remix)" - 4:04

References
 Ruža vetrova Beograda at Discogs
 EX YU ROCK enciklopedija 1960-2006,  Janjatović Petar;

External links
 Ruža vetrova Beograda at Discogs

Bajaga i Instruktori compilation albums
2003 compilation albums
Hi-Fi Centar compilation albums